The Action Army, also translated as the Army of Action, was a force formed by elements of the Ottoman Army sympathetic to the Committee of Union and Progress (CUP) during the 31 March Incident, sometimes referred to as the 1909 countercoup. Mobilised in Selanik (modern Thessaloniki) by Mahmud Shevket Pasha, it occupied Istanbul and successfully suppressed the uprising in the 31 March Incident.

Background

The 1908 Young Turk Revolution, led by the CUP, forced Sultan Abdul Hamid II to restore a system of constitutional monarchy, ushering in the Second Constitutional Era. The 1909 countercoup was instigated by a mutiny of dissatisfied troops in Istanbul, who were joined by reactionary religious protestors demanding a return to autocracy under Abdul Hamid and Sharia. With the resignation of Hüseyin Hilmi Pasha's cabinet the mutiny developed into a wider political crisis.

Composition
The Action Army was organised by Mahmud Shevket Pasha, commander of the Third Army based in Selanik. A number of staff officers opposed to the countercoup gathered in Selanik to join the force. It was also supported by divisions from the Second Army stationed in Adrianople (modern Edirne).

The force numbered around 20,000–25,000 Ottoman soldiers and was supplemented by 15,000 volunteers, including 4,000 Bulgarians, 2,000 Greeks and 700 Jews.  Çerçiz Topulli and Bajram Curri brought 8,000 Albanians troops, while Major Ahmed Niyazi Bey arrived with 1,800 men from Resne.

References

1909 in the Ottoman Empire